McDowell/Central Avenue (also known as Cultural District) is a light rail station on Valley Metro Rail in uptown Phoenix, Arizona, United States.  It is the tenth stop southbound, and is located on Central Avenue south of McDowell Road, across the street from the Burton Barr Central Library and one block south of the Phoenix Art Museum.

Ridership

Notable places nearby
 Phoenix Art Museum
 Burton Barr Central Library
 Margaret T. Hance Park on the Papago Freeway Tunnel
 Arizona Academy of Science
 BMO Tower
 Arizona Street Railway Museum
 Old Spaghetti Factory

References

External links
 Valley Metro map

Valley Metro Rail stations in Phoenix, Arizona
Railway stations in the United States opened in 2008
2008 establishments in Arizona